Etimesgut Belediyespor is a Turkish professional football club located in Ankara. The team currently competes in the TFF Second League.

League participations 
TFF Third League: 2000–2001, 2014–present
Turkish Regional Amateur League: 2013–2014

Stadium 
Currently the team plays at the 5,000-seat capacity Etimesgut Belediye Kemal Atatürk Stadı.

Current squad

Out on loan

References

External links 
Official website
Etimesgut Belediyespor on TFF.org

TFF Third League clubs
Football clubs in Turkey
Etimesgut District
Football clubs in Ankara